History of Eastern Germany may refer to:
History of the German Democratic Republic
History of eastern German regions:
Prussia
East Prussia
West Prussia
Silesia
East Brandenburg
Pomerania
Province of Posen